Sun Sui Wah (新瑞华) is a Cantonese restaurant with locations in Vancouver, British Columbia and Richmond, British Columbia known for its dim sum. and roasted squab.
It was the first restaurant in Vancouver to offer live Alaskan king crab in the mid-1980s.

References

External links
 Official website

Restaurants in Vancouver